XAF may refer to:

Central African CFA franc (ISO4217 Currency Code) 
The Bizana, Eastern Cape vehicle registration plates code
XIAP-associated factor
XAF Radar, an experimental pre-World War II U.S. Navy radar
Xaf (music producer), an electronic music producer